Randall Enos (born January 30, 1936) is an American illustrator and cartoonist.

Enos was born in New Bedford, Massachusetts. Throughout his career, which began in the 1960s, Enos has worked mostly in linocuts.

Enos's work has appeared in the National Lampoon (where he produced the monthly strip Chicken Gutz in the 1970s), The Nation, the New York Times, Playboy, Time, Sports Illustrated, The Atlantic, Rolling Stone and other publications. His work is syndicated by Cagle Cartoons.

Enos has taught at colleges and art schools including Parsons School of Design, Philadelphia University of the Arts, RISD, Syracuse University, and others and has illustrated many books, including children's books. Enos, who (being from New Bedford) is interested in whaling history and collects whaling memorabilia, collaborated with Brian Heinz on the 2014 book Mocha Dick, contributing his abstract-folkish visual interpretations to the picture-book, a depiction of the historical whale which inspired the novel Moby Dick.

Controversy 
Enos caused controversy when a cartoon of his was published in the Bennington Banner following the 2017 Las Vegas shooting that depicted a pile of bodies with the caption "What happens in Vegas..." The paper later apologized for publishing the cartoon and stated that the cartoon was "insulting and in bad taste" and that "we regret and apologize for publishing the cartoon."

Awards 
Enos was nominated for the 2010 Advertising Illustration Award given by the National Cartoonist Society for his artwork promoting a revival of The Norman Conquests.

Personal life 
He lives on a horse farm in Connecticut with his wife Leann.

Books illustrated

 Seligson, Marcia; Gerberg, Mort; Corman, Avery (1967). You Have a Hang-Up If...:All About the Kookiness in People's Heads Today. Randall Enos (illustrator). Essandess Special Editions, a division of Simon & Schuster, Inc.

References

External links
Chicken Gutz

Living people
People from New Bedford, Massachusetts
Artists from Massachusetts
Artists from Connecticut
American illustrators
American engravers
National Lampoon people
American comic strip cartoonists
1936 births